Howald is a German-language surname. Notable people with the surname include:

Florian Howald, Swiss orienteering competitor
Martin Howald, Swiss orienteering competitor
Patrick Howald,  Swiss professional ice hockey player (retired)
Arthur M. Howald, inventor of fishing rods, see Ugly Stik

German-language surnames